R. Chittibabu (25 May 1927 – 28 January 1999) was an Indian cinematographer, who worked primarily in Kannada cinema, Karnataka. He became a cinematographer in the early 1950s, working on about hundred films in the Film industry and most of which starred Dr. Rajkumar in the lead role and were highly successful in the Box-Office. R. Chittibabu is famously known for the movies Kasturi Nivasa(1971), Naagarahaavu(1972), Naa Ninna Mareyalare(1976), Bayalu Daari(1976), Huliya Haalina Mevu(1979), Chakravyuha (1983 film).

Personal life

Early life 
R. Chittibabu was born in Chidambaram, in the state of Tamil Nadu in India on 25 May 1927 to Shivanandam and Rajamma.

Married life 
R. Chittibabu married Lalitha. They had seven children.

Film career 
In his early career, he worked as Camera Assistant in Revathi Studio, Chennai. Impressed by his interest towards Cinematography, B. S. Ranga offered R. Chittibabu to work as Assistant Cameraman in the film Devadasu (1953 film).

Worked as an operative Cameraman for Chella Pillai in 1955

R. Chittibabu debuted as a cinematographer in the 1966 Kannada film Love in Bangalore, Followed by a successful journey of 72 more Kannada films, 13 Tamil films, 5 Telugu films and 4 Hindi Films.  Famously known for the movies Kasturi Nivasa (1971), Naagarahaavu (1972), Naa Ninna Mareyalare (1976), Bayalu Daari (1976), Huliya Haalina Mevu (1979), Chakravyuha and Teri Meherbaniyan (1985).

"Baare Baare" song from the 1972 film Naagarahaavu made history as the first slow-motion song of Indian cinema. Cinematographer R. Chittibabu along with film director Puttanna Kanagal experimented the slow-motion technique for this song, which turned out to be a big hit.

Awards 

 Lavanya Film Award for Excellent Cinematography for Naa Ninna Mareyalare (1976)
 Memento by Govt. of Karnataka for serving Kannada cinema (1984)
 Madras Film-Fans Award
 Lions club Shield

Filmography 
As Cinematographer

Kannada films 
73 Film Titles

Tamil films 
11 Film Titles

Telugu films 
4 Film Titles

Hindi films 
4 Film Titles

References

General

Cinematographer references

External links 
 
 https://www.cinestaan.com/people/r-chittibabu-13974
 https://www.moviebuff.com/r-chittibabu
 https://www.cinemaazi.com/people/r-chittibabu
 https://www.filmibeat.com/celebs/chittibabu/biography

1927 births
1999 deaths
Cinematographers from Karnataka
Kannada film cinematographers
Hindi film cinematographers
Tamil film cinematographers
Telugu film cinematographers